Homalocalyx ericaeus is a member of the family Myrtaceae endemic to Western Australia.

It blooms between July and August producing white flowers.

It is found on sandstone plateaus in a small area in the east Kimberley region of Western Australia where it grows in shallow soils.

References

ericaeus
Endemic flora of Western Australia
Myrtales of Australia
Rosids of Western Australia
Plants described in 1857
Taxa named by Ferdinand von Mueller